Illaena exilis is a species of beetle in the family Cerambycidae. It was described by Wilhelm Ferdinand Erichson in 1842. It is known from Australia.

References

Desmiphorini
Beetles described in 1842